Brigadier Eric David "Birdie" Smith CBE DSO (August 1923 – 7 March 1998) was a senior British Army officer and military historian who was awarded the Distinguished Service Order, for leadership and gallantry on 3 September 1944, whilst serving with the 2nd Battalion, the 7th Gurkha Rifles in Italy, during the Second World War. Smith later commanded the 1st/2nd Gurkhas in Borneo during the Malaysia-Indonesia Confrontation. He was appointed a Commander of the Order of the British Empire (CBE) in 1975.

Early life

Birdie Smith, was born in Cupar, Fife, Scotland in August 1923. He was nicknamed Birdie because his nose was considered to resemble a bird's beak. He was educated at Allhallows College, Dorset. He joined the Indian Army in 1941 and following attendance at the Officer Training Unit at Bangalore was commissioned and posted to the 7th Gurkha Rifles in 1942. He served with the 2nd/7th Gurkhas in India and Palestine from 1942 to 1944.

Military career

He joined the 4th Indian Division in Italy and fought at Castle Hill during the Battle of Monte Cassino. Later in the Italian campaign, at midnight on 3 September 1944, Smith led Letter C company, 2nd Battalion, the 7th Gurkha Rifles in the attack on Tavoleto, on the Gothic Line, which was heavily defended. The Gurkhas attack was met by heavy enemy machine gun fire and later a heavy mortar barrage. Smith although wounded in the leg, killed all the occupants of the first Spandau post encountered with grenades and machine-gun fire; he continued to lead his company which during the fierce fighting was reduced from approximately 100 men to 28 and successfully cleared the village. He was awarded the DSO for his leadership and gallantry whilst wounded during the attack.[10]
 
He later served in Greece from November 1944 to 1946 and in India from 1946 to 1947. He also attended the Staff College, Camberley. He served as a Gurkha recruiting officer in Darjeeling, India, from 1948 to 1950. He served as an intelligence officer in the Malayan Emergency from 1950 to 1956 and also served in the Cyprus Emergency.

In 1962 Smith was posted to Borneo as second-in-command of 1/7th Gurkhas. On 20 April 1964 he was involved in a helicopter crash in the Borneo jungle. The Journey made on a Wessex helicopter commenced at Sibu, Sarawak, and the destination was a forward company base operating north of the Indonesian border. Following the crash, to free him from the wreckage, his right arm was amputated by the battalion's medical officer Captain, later Major-General Patrick Crawford using an Army clasp knife. During the amputation he was fully conscious. He was later taken by another helicopter to Kuching for further surgery. He remained in Borneo and a year after the helicopter crash took over command of the 1st/2nd Gurkhas. He remained in command of the 1st/2nd Gurkhas following their move to Hong Kong.

His final post was commanding the Gurkha recruiting bases in Nepal.

He retired from the British Army on 1 June 1978.

Honours and later life

Smith was Colonel of the 7th Gurkhas from 1975 to 1982. He was appointed MBE in 1952 and CBE in 1975.

Smith died on 7 March 1998. He was survived by his wife and two daughters.

Works 

Smith was the author of several books on Gurkha history, including:

References 

 Supplement to the London Gazette, 8 March 1945.

1998 deaths
1923 births
Commanders of the Order of the British Empire
Companions of the Distinguished Service Order
Royal Gurkha Rifles officers
Indian Army personnel of World War II
People educated at Allhallows College
People from Cupar
British Indian Army officers
British Army personnel of the Indonesia–Malaysia confrontation
British Army brigadiers
Graduates of the Staff College, Camberley
Military personnel from Fife
British military personnel of the Malayan Emergency
British military personnel of the Cyprus Emergency
Scottish amputees